Novoye is a rural locality (a village) in Sosnovskoye Rural Settlement, Vologodsky District, Vologda Oblast, Russia. The population was 230 as of 2002.

Geography 
The distance to Vologda is 35.5 km, to Sosnovka is 16 km. Sosnovy Bereg is the nearest rural locality.

References 

Rural localities in Vologodsky District